Mikael Lind (born February 20, 1972) is a Swedish professional ice hockey player currently with the Brynäs IF team in the Swedish Elitserien league.

External links

References 

1972 births
Swedish ice hockey centres
Brynäs IF players
Timrå IK players
People from Gävle
Living people
Sportspeople from Gävleborg County